Surgeon Rear-Admiral Charles Marsh Beadnell, CB (17 February 1872 – 27 September 1947), best known as C. Marsh Beadnell, was a British surgeon and Royal Navy officer.

Beadnell was born in Rawalpindi. He was educated at Cheltenham College and studied medicine at Guy's Hospital. He was a Fellow of the Chemical Society and of the Royal Anthropological Institute. A rationalist and sceptic, he was president of the Rationalist Press Association (1940–1947).

Beadnell described himself as a "devout agnostic". He died in Petersfield, Hampshire.

Selected publications
 The Reality or Unreality of Spiritualistic Phenomena: Being a Criticism of Dr. W.J. Crawford's Investigation into Levitations and Raps (1920)
 A Picture Book of Evolution: Adapted from the Work of the Late Dennis Hird (1932)
 Fireside Science (1934) [with Ray Lankester]
 Dictionary of Scientific Terms, as Used in the Various Sciences (1938)
 The Origin of the Kiss and Other Scientific Diversions (1942)
 An Encyclopaedic Dictionary of Science and War (1943)

References

1872 births
1947 deaths
British agnostics
British sceptics
Critics of parapsychology
People educated at Cheltenham College
Rationalists
Companions of the Order of the Bath